Mesa Union Elementary School District  is a public school district based in Ventura County, California, United States located on State Route 118. Many Mesa students attend Rio Mesa High School of the Oxnard Union High School District after completing 8th grade.

The Del Norte School District, that eventually merged with Center School District, may have been formed in the 1890s and had a one-room schoolhouse on Los Angeles Avenue (now SR 118) near Santa Clara Avenue.

References

External links
 

School districts in Ventura County, California
1937 establishments in California
School districts established in 1937